Tancheon, a tributary of Seoul's Han River, is a stream beginning in the city of Yongin in Gyeonggi-do and flowing through Seongnam and then between the districts of Songpa-gu and Gangnam-gu in Seoul before entering flowing into the Han River. It has a total length of 35.6 kilometres.

Winding through the district of Bundang, the stream is one of the widely recognised symbols of the borough. All streams in the Bundang area flow towards the Tancheon. The area also serves as a large park and there are paths for both walkers and cyclists on each bank with occasional foot bridges joining the two sides in addition to the bridges built for vehicle traffic. Along the paths there are many benches as well as exercise equipment. The whole area is extremely popular among local residents.

The stream empties into the Han River by the Olympic Stadium in Seoul.

History

The Tancheon has been known by many other names, such as Geomcheon (검천, 儉川), Heomcheon (험천, 險川), Meonae (머내), Cheonhocheon (천호천, 穿呼川), and Jancheon (잔천, 鵲川). The word Tancheon (탄천, 炭川) itself is composed of the Chinese characters for charcoal and stream, so a direct translation would be Charcoal Stream. In pure Korean it would be pronounced Sunnae (숯내->순내), another name for the stream that has gone by. The origins of this name can be found in Korean folklore, as is explained below.

It is believed that his long life came from picking and eating peaches at the stream of Seo Wang-mo (서왕모, 西王母), the goddess of immortality. For this, he became blessed with unnaturally long life. Some say, however, that his living 3,000 lifetimes was an exaggeration caused by the slip of a brushstroke and that he may have actually only lived 30 lifetimes. At one point, the Chinese characters for thirty (三十) may have accidentally come to be read as three thousand (三千), by someone adding one extra stroke to the top of ten.

Nevertheless, Dong Bangsak, with his long life, proved to be an irritation to the spiritual world. In the eyes of many spirits from the underworld, he had cheated death once too many times. So eager were they to catch him, and bring his soul with them to the afterlife, that they searched everywhere for him. However, as he was quick of wit and a man of immeasurably great wisdom, their efforts were always in vain. In fact, on many occasions he would even receive the spirits who managed to track him down as guests in his home. After a short period of entertaining them, he was able to send them on their way without even so much as a struggle. So skilled was he at persuasion, that in no time he had the spirits believing they had mistaken him for someone else. They would then go off again searching, never the wiser as to this man's true identity.

One spirit, who was determined to be fooled no longer, thought about the problem seriously. After deep contemplation, he came up with a cunning plan that would surely allow him to capture Dong Bangsak once and for all. As it happened, Dong Bangsak was one day passing over the Tancheon. There, he came upon someone washing clothes in the stream water with a piece of charcoal. It was the spirit disguised as a human. Unable to resist this unusual sight, Dong Bang-sak asked, “Why are you using that charcoal to wash your clothes?”

The spirit replied, “Because charcoal gets them whiter, of course!”

Upon hearing this, Dong Bangsak burst out into a ferocious laughter and said, “Ha! My boy, I have lived 180 millennia, but never have I heard of someone making clothes whiter by washing them with charcoal!”

With this slip of the tongue, the illusive Dong Bangsak had given himself away. The spirit at once knew that he had at long last found the man whom he had been looking for. He then quickly apprehended Dong Bangsak and took him to the underworld, bringing to a close the life of this long lived man of wit and deception. From this, though, we have the name for this well-known stream, the Tancheon: The Stream of Charcoal.

Water parks
Along the approximately 25-kilometre stretch of the Tancheon that passes through Seongnam, there are five water parks open to the public. They are free of charge and popular with families with young children. The Tancheon water parks (탄천 물놀이장) are open every year from July 1 to August 31, from 10 a.m. to 8 p.m. At the parks there are changing rooms available as well as many chairs and picnic tables. They can be found at:

 Yatap-dong, in front of Manna Church (만나 교회앞)
 Jeongja-dong, in front of Singi Elementary School (신기 초등학교앞) 
 Geumgok-dong, in front of Bulgok Middle School (불곡 중학교앞)
 Imae-dong, by the Unjung Stream footpath (운중천)
 Behind the Bundang district office (분당구청뒤)

Strategic Importance
As with the Subway Bundang Line, Tancheon is a strategic lifeline for commuters who work to Seoul. The bicycle path is linked with the Han river, and due to its connection with Seoul Airbase, it was designed to make jeeps and motorcycles accessible in the event of war.

Photographs
These photographs are in order from south to north, i.e. from source to mouth.

See also
Rivers of Korea
Geography of South Korea

References

Bundang
Rivers of South Korea
Rivers of Seoul
Parks in Seoul